Haley Sales (born December 26, 1996) is a Canadian ice dancer. With her skating partner, Nikolas Wamsteeker, she is the 2020 Bavarian Open bronze medallist and 2018 Lake Placid Ice Dance International bronze medallist. The two placed 9th at the 2018 Four Continents Championships.

Personal life

Sales was born on December 26, 1996, in Quesnel, British Columbia. She was raised in Quesnel before moving to the Vancouver area.

Skating career

Early years
Sales began learning to skate in 2000. She won the bronze medal in the novice ladies' category at the 2012 Canadian Championships.
She started training in ice dancing without a partner.

Partnership with Wamsteeker

Sales teamed up with Nikolas Wamsteeker in March 2014. They decided to train under Megan Wing and Aaron Lowe in Burnaby, British Columbia. The two placed ninth in the junior event at the 2015 Canadian Championships. The following season, they competed at one ISU Junior Grand Prix event, finishing sixth in Austria, and ranked fourth at the 2016 Canadian Championships.

Sales/Wamsteeker made their senior international debut at the Lake Placid Ice Dance International in late July 2016. They finished seventh in Lake Placid, ninth at the 2016 CS Autumn Classic International, and fifth at the 2017 Canadian Championships.

Competing in their second senior season, Sales/Wamsteeker placed tenth at the 2017 CS Nebelhorn Trophy and 6th at the 2018 Canadian Championships. They were selected to represent Canada at the 2018 Four Continents Championships in Taipei, Taiwan; the duo finished ninth after placing eighth in the short dance and tenth in the free.

They won a bronze medal at the Lake Placid International Dance trophy and then placed fourth at the 2018 U.S. Classic. They made their Grand Prix debut at the 2018 Skate Canada International, where they placed ninth.  At the 2019 Canadian Championships, they placed a career-best fourth, a placement the replicated the following year despite a fall by Sales in the rhythm dance.

Sales/Wamsteeker were assigned to the 2020 Skate Canada International, but the event was cancelled as a result of the coronavirus pandemic. They placed fourth at the virtually-held 2021 Skate Canada Challenge, while the 2021 Canadian Championships were subsequently cancelled.

In June of 2021, Sales/Wamsteeker announced that they would be moving to train at the Ice Academy of Montreal's campus in London, Ontario, coached by two-time Olympic champion Scott Moir.

Programs 
(with Wamsteeker)

Competitive highlights 
GP: Grand Prix; CS: Challenger Series; JGP: Junior Grand Prix

Ice dancing with Wamsteeker

Ladies' singles

References

External links 
 

1996 births
Canadian female ice dancers
Living people